Vortex is a remix album by the group Collide featuring remixes of songs from their albums Chasing the Ghost (2000) and Some Kind of Strange (2003) and 3 new covers.

Track listing

CD 1 - Vortex
"Euphoria" (Emirian Mix by Charlie Clouser) 6:32
"Feed Me to the Lions" 4:07
"Slither Thing" (Amish Rake Fight Mix by Mike Fisher) 4:37
"Razor Sharp" (Dull Mix by Wade Alin) 3:59
"Like You Want to Believe" (Antistatic Mix by Remko Vander Spek) 3:53
"The Lunatics Have Taken Over the Asylum" 5:34
"Predator" – Front Line Assembly (Final Mix by Collide) 6:32
"Crushed" (5AM Heavenly Mix by Dave Simpson) 4:57
"Wings of Steel" (Core Mix by Nils Schulte) 6:36
"Halo" (Sensory Gate Aura Mix by A. Pozzi/F. Corsini) 7:49
"Inside" (Shoe Gazing Mix by Kevin Kipnis) 5:57
"Somewhere" (Orchestral Mix by Mark Walk) 3:06
"Frozen" (Chill Mix by Statik) 7:37

CD 2 - Xetrov
"Haunted When the Minutes Drag" 7:43
"Tempted" (Conjure One Mix by Rhys Fulber) 6:27
"Crushed" (Fragment Mix by Vincent Saletto) 7:22
"Like You Want to Believe" (Cylab Mix by Percy) 4:11
"Crushed" (Out of Control Mix by Jesse Maddox) 4:23
"Wings of Steel" (The Sound of Glass Mix by Aaron McDonald) 3:28
"Inside" (External Mix by Wade Alin) 4:21
"Crushed" (Now Forgotten Mix by Ian Ross) 5:23
"Wings of Steel" (hEADaCHE Mix by hEADaCHE) 3:28
"Like You Want to Believe" (Bondango's Twisted Acid Mix by Marty Ball) 4:48
"Crushed" (Scored Mix by Shane Terpening) 5:26
"Wings of Steel" (Astro Sensorium Mix by Oleg Skrynnik) 7:04
"Euphoria" (Tears Mix by J. Constantine and A. Ruggles) 4:43

References

Albums produced by Charlie Clouser
2004 remix albums
Collide (band) albums